Growing Through Life (Traditional Chinese: 摘星之旅) is a 2010 TVB series co-production with Shanghai Television.

Synopsis
Hoi Sing (Hanson) (Raymond Lam) and his mother Ho Wai Sum (Lui Yau Wai) runs a domestic appliance manufacturing factory (Sing Moon Tin Electrical Appliance) that have been left by his father. Hanson’s uncle Hoi Leung (Albert) (Damian Lau), a money-minded businessman seeks any opportunity to acquire Sing Moon Tin.

Albert's wife Cheng Ming Chu (Liza) (Cecilia Yip) and daughter Hoi Mei Si (Macy) (Toby Leung) intercede the acquisition plans as they value the importance of family since the business belongs to the family and that Hanson would like to maintain Sing Moon Tin. Through persuasion Liza and Macy convinces Albert to put the acquisition on hold.

However, a business opportunity arises, Albert (being the major shareholder) places a spy Fong Lai King (Zhao Ziqi) in the factory to cause mishaps. To persuade Albert in giving up on the business plan, Wai Sum decides to reveal a long-kept secret to him. Hanson invites his friend Chung Lam Tai (Linus) (Bosco Wong) to join the factory so that he no longer has to fight alone for the family business.

Withholding the trust in the friendship it does not cross Hanson's mind that Linus would betray him such that his friend is a wolf in sheep skin. Hanson's fiance Chok Yiu Kwan (Ella) (Vionn Song) cancels the wedding all of a sudden and gets betrayed by Linus. Then, the cold reality eventually forces Hanson into the fiercest commercial wars.

Cast

Hoi family

Chung family

Fong Family

Chok Family

Other Casts

Viewership ratings

Awards and nominations
TVB Anniversary Awards (2010)
 Nominated: Best Drama
 Nominated: Best Actor (Damian Lau)
 Nominated: Best Actor (Bosco Wong)

References

External links
TVB.com Growing Through Life - Official Website 
K for TVB Growing Through Life Synopsis - 

TVB dramas
2010 Hong Kong television series debuts
2010 Hong Kong television series endings